INS Vagsheer (S26) is the sixth submarine of the first batch of six s for the Indian Navy. The ship was launched on 20 April 2022.

Capable of enemy radar evasion, area surveillance, intelligence gathering, advanced acoustic silencing techniques, low radiated noise levels, hydro-dynamically optimised shape.
Ability to launch a crippling attack on the enemy using precision guided weapons with both 18 torpedoes and  tube-launched anti-ship missiles at the same time, underwater or on surface, 18 torpedoes for anti-submarine warfare and anti-surface warfare, stealth technology enabled Kalvari-class submarine is 221 feet long, 40 feet high, it has 20 kmph speed at sea surface level, 37 kmph below it, 350 metres underwater submerging limits for 50 days, 360 battery cells runs its diesel-electric submarine.

Etymology 
Vagsheer refers to a type of sandfish found in the Indian Ocean.

Gallery

References

2022 ships